Natalia Martínez  (born November 25, 2000) is a Dominican Republic female volleyball player. With her club Mirador she competed at the 2015 FIVB Club World Championship.

She won the 2015 FIVB U20 World Championship gold medal and silver in the 2017 FIVB U18 World Championship.

Career

2014
Martínez helped her home country to win for the first time Youth NORCECA Championship defeating the United States and qualifying for the 2015 FIVB Girls' World Championship at the time she was decorated with the Most Valuable Player award. She later won the U23 Pan-American Cup, defeating 3-1 Colombia in the final match.

2015
Martínez played with the Dominican club Mirador the FIVB Club World Championship, and her club lost its two matches 1-3 to the Swiss Voléro Zürich and 0-3 to the Brazilian Rexona Ades Rio and finally ranking tied-fifth with the Japanese Hisamitsu Springs. With her U18 national team, she played the FIVB U18 World Championship in Peru in July, helping his nation to reach the 17th place in the tournament. She later won the FIVB U20 World Championship gold medal, the first ever volleyball title for the Dominican Republic, after performing 6-0 after the pool play.

2016
The Dominican Republic won the NORCECA Junior Championship
and qualified to the 2017 FIVB Women's Junior World Championship lead by Martínez who won the Most Valuable Player. She later guided her U18 national team to qualify for the 2017 FIVB Girls' World Championship and the gold medal in the NORCECA Youth Championship being awarded Most Valuable Player and Best Scorer.

2017
Martínez played the 2017 FIVB U20 World Championship were her team could only rank 11th, and the 2017 FIVB U23 World Championship in Ljubljana, Slovenia, losing 2-4 the bronze medal to Bulgaria. She won the 2017 FIVB U18 World Championship silver medal when her team lost 1-3 to Italy in the final match. She won the U23 tournament gold medal played in the 2017 Bolivarian Games.

Clubs
  Mirador (2015)
  Jakarta Elektrik PLN (2022)

Awards

Individuals
 2014 NORCECA Youth Championship "Most Valuable Player"
 2015 Youth Pan American Cup "Best Server"
 2016 NORCECA Junior Championship "Most Valuable Player"
 2016 NORCECA Youth Championship "Most Valuable Player"
 2016 NORCECA Youth Championship "Best Scorer"

References

2000 births
Living people
Dominican Republic women's volleyball players
Sportspeople from Santo Domingo
Outside hitters